The Cambridge History of Japan is a multi-volume survey of Japanese history published by Cambridge University Press (CUP).  This was the first major collaborative synthesis presenting the current state of knowledge of Japanese history.  The series aims to present as full a view of Japanese history as possible. The collaborative work brings together the writing of Japanese specialists and historians of Japan.

History
Plans for the project were initiated in the 1970s; and the first of the volumes was published in 1988.

The general editor, John Whitney Hall, was expressly focused on the task of identifying arrays of relationships in Japanese history—such as, for example, between the chronology of military exploits in the 16th century and an account of consequences which developed over time.

The several volumes include:
 Vol. 1. Ancient Japan, edited by Delmer Brown (1993)
 Vol. 2. Heian Japan, edited by Donald Shively and William H. McCullough (1999)
 Vol. 3. Medieval Japan, edited by Kozo Yamamura (1990)
 Vol. 4. Early modern Japan, edited by John Whitney Hall and James McClain (1991)
 Vol. 5. The Nineteenth Century, edited by Marius Jansen (1989)
 Vol. 6. The Twentieth Century, edited by Peter Duus (1988)

Notes

See also
The Cambridge History of Japanese Literature

References
 Hall, John Whitney. (1988–1999). The Cambridge History of Japan. Cambridge: Cambridge University Press. OCLC 17483588
 Macfarlane, Alan.  "'Japan' in an English Mirror," Modern Asian Studies,Volume 31, Issue 4 (Oct., 1997), 763–806.

External links
 Cambridge University Press,  Cambridge history online



1988 non-fiction books
Cambridge University Press books
History books about Japan
Cambridge
Japanese studies